The 2017 German Open (also known as the 2017 German Tennis Championships) was a men's tennis tournament played on outdoor red clay courts. It was the 111th edition of the German Open Tennis Championships and part of the ATP World Tour 500 series of the 2017 ATP World Tour. It took place at the Am Rothenbaum in Hamburg, Germany, from July 24 through 30, 2017.

Points and prize money

Points distribution

Prize money

Singles main draw entrants

Seeds 

 1 Rankings are as of July 17, 2017

Other entrants 
The following players received wildcards into the singles main draw:
  Daniel Altmaier
  Tommy Haas
  Maximilian Marterer

The following players received entry using a protected ranking:
  Andreas Haider-Maurer
  Dmitry Tursunov

The following player received entry as a special exempt:
  Andrey Rublev

The following players received entry from the qualifying draw:
  Federico Delbonis
  Damir Džumhur
  Rudolf Molleker
  Cedrik-Marcel Stebe

The following players received entry as lucky losers:
  José Hernández-Fernández
  Leonardo Mayer

Withdrawals
Before the tournament
  Pablo Carreño Busta →replaced by  Andrey Kuznetsov
  Borna Ćorić →replaced by  Nicolás Kicker
  Rogério Dutra Silva →replaced by  José Hernández-Fernández
  Richard Gasquet →replaced by  Dmitry Tursunov
  Martin Kližan →replaced by  Leonardo Mayer
  Yūichi Sugita →replaced by  Rogério Dutra Silva
  Janko Tipsarević →replaced by  Evgeny Donskoy

Doubles main draw entrants

Seeds 

 Rankings are as of July 17, 2017

Other entrants 
The following pairs received wildcards into the doubles main draw:
  Daniel Altmaier /  Tommy Haas 
  Kevin Krawietz /  Tim Pütz

The following pair received entry from the qualifying draw:
  Federico Delbonis /  Leonardo Mayer

Withdrawals 
During the tournament
  Rogério Dutra Silva
  Fernando Verdasco

Champions

Singles 

  Leonardo Mayer def.  Florian Mayer 6–4, 4–6, 6–3.

Doubles 

  Ivan Dodig /  Mate Pavić def.  Pablo Cuevas /  Marc López 6–3, 6–4.

References

External links 
 

2017 ATP World Tour
2010s in Hamburg
2017 in German tennis
 
2017
July 2017 sports events in Germany